Peronia platei is a species of slug, a marine gastropod mollusk in the family Onchidiidae, one of the families of sea slugs. Nine species of Peronia are recognized; the way to tell them apart is by DNA sequencing by mitochondrial and nuclear sequence or checking their internal anatomy. This species has hermaphroditic parts in the posterior regions of the deferent duct and straight oviduct. The male part is the muscular sac of the accessory penial gland in the anterior area. It is distributed across the entire tropical and subtropical Indo-West Pacific, from South Africa to Hawaii.

Classification 
Intertidal sea slugs are gastropods belonging to the subclass Heterobranchia and the family Onchiididae. They share many characteristics of shell-less marine mollusks, including dorsal gills that are visible when relaxed and retracted when crawling during low tide.

Distribution and habitat 
This species has a cosmopolitan distribution across the entire tropical and subtropical Indo-West Pacific, from South Africa to Hawaii. It prefers the rocky intertidal area, stays hidden in crevices such as the lagoon during high tide, and only comes out during low tide.

Description 
Peronia platei has a body that isn't flattened and is grey colored with small rounded protrusions on the exterior surface. It has black dorsal eyes at the tip and gills present under the dorsal notum.Peronia platei has gills on its back (dorsalnotum) and has hermaphroditic parts in the posterior regions of the deferent duct and straight oviduct. The male part is the muscular sac of the accessory penial gland in the anterior area that is 5 mm long; the spine of the accessory penial gland is 0.9 mm long, narrow, elongated, straight, or slightly curved. The specimen has intestinal loops of type V and several dorsal papillae with eyes and rachidian and innermost lateral teeth. They breathe air using their gills and die if exposed to water for too long. The color of the dorsal notum is dark grey, including papillae; some papillae show black dorsal eyes at their tip, and the number of papillae with dorsal eyes varies (from 7 to 10). Its mantle (hyponotum) is light yellow, and the foot is pale yellow to orange. The ocular tentacles are grey, like the head.

Human use 
This species is being used to study anatomical and systematic descriptions for future research. It is an indicator species that give clues about the health of the oceanic environment.

References

Further reading 
 Arey, Leslie B., and William John Crozier. "On the natural history of Onchidium." Journal of Experimental Zoology 32.3 (1921): 443-502.
 Dayrat, Benoît, et al. “Systematic Revision of the Genus Peronia Fleming, 1822 (Gastropoda, Euthyneura, Pulmonata, Onchidiidae).” ZooKeys, Pensoft Publishers, 10 Jan. 2020, https://zookeys.pensoft.net/article/52853/.
 Dayrat, Benoît, et al. “Systematic Revision of the Genus Peronia Fleming, 1822 (Gastropoda, Euthyneura, Pulmonata, Onchidiidae).” ZooKeys, vol. 972, no. 36, 2020, pp. 1–224, https://doi.org/10.3897/zookeys.972.52853.
 Goulding Tricia C., Tan Shau Hwai, Tan Siong Kiat, Apte Deepak, Bhave Vishal, Narayana Sumantha, Salunkhe Rahul, Dayrat Benoît (2018) A revision of Peronina Plate, 1893 (Gastropoda : Euthyneura : Onchidiidae) based on mitochondrial and nuclear DNA sequences, morphology and natural history. Invertebrate Systematics 32, 803-826.
 Mackey, A. (2019, May 17). SNAPSHOT: These 17 New Sea Slugs Show Life Really is Better Under the Sea. Discover Magazine. Retrieved October 9, 2022, from https://www.discovermagazine.com/planet-earth/snapshot-these-17-new-sea-slugs-show-life-really-is-better-under-the-sea
 Peronia Platei - Plazi TreatmentBank. treatment.plazi.org/GgServer/html/2E9F377F18D55B2F96BB82549FF4CD1E. Accessed 23 Sept. 2022.

Wikipedia Student Program
Onchidiidae
Gastropods described in 1928